Be My Valentine, Charlie Brown is the 13th prime-time animated television special based on the comic strip Peanuts by Charles M. Schulz. In the United States, it debuted on CBS on January 28, 1975.

The special received an Emmy nomination for Outstanding Children's Special at the 27th Primetime Emmy Awards in 1975. It was one of two Peanuts specials nominated that year, along with It's the Easter Beagle, Charlie Brown, but they both lost to Yes, Virginia, there is a Santa Claus (another Bill Melendez production).

Plot
Linus is fond of his teacher, Miss Othmar. To show his love, he buys her a huge heart-shaped box of candy. When he leaves, Sally believes that he bought it for her and decides to make him a valentine in return. Later, Lucy goes to a "pawpet" show held by Snoopy. With Charlie Brown as the narrator, Snoopy tells a story about true love. At home, when Sally tries to make a valentine with very little success, Charlie Brown tries to show her how to cut out a heart, only to get upstaged by Snoopy, who makes a music box themed valentine.

Valentine's Day comes and the gang brings valentine cards for everybody. Charlie Brown brings a briefcase hoping to receive many. During the party, everybody gets their cards and candy hearts (including one read by Sally and acted out by Snoopy, that, somehow, contains the entirety of Sonnet 43 from Sonnets from the Portuguese by Elizabeth Barrett Browning). After the cards are passed out, it turns out Charlie Brown has received nothing except for one candy heart which says "FORGET IT, KID!". Linus is also upset as he was unable to give the box of candy to Miss Othmar (as she left with her boyfriend). Charlie Brown and Linus vent their heartbreak in different ways: Linus throws the candy off a bridge (where each piece is caught and eaten by Snoopy and Woodstock). Charlie Brown slams his briefcase on his mailbox and kicks the latter, hurting his foot.

The next day, when Charlie Brown checks his mailbox for a belated valentine from the Little Red Haired Girl, Violet gives Charlie Brown a used valentine (having erased her name from it) as an apology. Schroeder sees past the attempt and thoroughly reprimands her, Lucy, Sally, and the others. He warns Charlie Brown not to accept them because of what happened. Despite his best efforts, he does so anyway. As he and Linus meet at the brick wall later, he admits remorse that he let Schroeder down after he defended him against the girls' thoughtlessness. However, he expresses hope that Violet's pity valentine will start a trend and he will get more the next year. Linus warns him not to be too optimistic at all.

Voice cast
 Duncan Watson as Charlie Brown
 Melanie Kohn as Lucy van Pelt
 Stephen Shea as Linus van Pelt
 Lynn Mortensen as Sally Brown
 Greg Felton as Schroeder
 Linda Ercoli as Violet/Frieda
 Bill Melendez as Snoopy/Woodstock

Music score
The music score for the special was composed by Vince Guaraldi (except where noted) and conducted and arranged by John Scott Trotter. It was recorded by the Vince Guaraldi Trio on December 30, 1974, and January 3, 1975, at Wally Heider Studios, featuring Guaraldi (piano, electric piano, Minimoog, ARP String Ensemble, electric guitar), Seward McCain (electric bass) and Vince Lateano (drums).

The special's theme song, "Heartburn Waltz" (Track 15) is performed in ten different variations.

"Heartburn Waltz" (version 1, piano-driven)
"Heartburn Waltz" (version 2)
"Valentine Interlude" (version 1)
"Linus and Lucy" (bridge; pounding erasers)
"Heartburn Waltz" (version 3, minor key)
"Piano Sonata No. 20, Op. 49 No. 2 in G Major: I. Allegro ma non troppo" (Ludwig van Beethoven)
"Heartburn Waltz" (version 4, Latin shuffle)
"Linus and Lucy" (bridge; heart-shaped box of candy)
"Pawpet Overture" (Lucy and the Concession stand)
"Nocturne in E major, Op. 9, No. 2" (aka "Freddie's Mood)" (version 1, Pawpet Theater music) (Frédéric Chopin, arr. by Vince Guaraldi)
"Heartburn Waltz" (version 5)
"Never Again"
"Minuet in G Major, BWV Anh. 116" (Johann Sebastian Bach)
"Woodstock's Mambo"
"Heartburn Waltz" (version 6)
"Jennie L."
"Heartburn Waltz" (version 7)
"Valentine Interlude No. 2"
"Heartburn Waltz" (version 8; different cue than that of cue 15 above despite identical title)
"There's Been a Change"
"Woodstock's Revenge"
"Heartburn Waltz" (aka "Charlie Brown's Wake-Up") (version 9)
"Heartburn Waltz" (version 10, closing tag)
"Nocturne in E major, Op. 9, No. 2" (aka "Freddie's Mood") (version 2, Paw Pet Theater music end credits) (Frédéric Chopin, arr. by Vince Guaraldi)

No official soundtrack for the special was released. However, a mono version of "Heartburn Waltz" (version 6) was first released in 1998 on Charlie Brown's Holiday Hits, marking the first time any music cues from the special received a general release.

In the mid-2000s, recording session master tapes for seven 1970s-era Peanuts television specials scored by Guaraldi were discovered by his son, David Guaraldi. This resulted in four additional cues — "Never Again", "Heartburn Waltz" (version 8), "There's Been a Change" and "Heartburn Waltz" (aka "Charlie Brown's Wake-Up") (version 9) — being made available on the compilation album, Vince Guaraldi and the Lost Cues from the Charlie Brown Television Specials, Volume 2 (2008).

Television
The special originally aired annually on CBS from 1975 to 2000. The special placed in the top 20 for television ratings in its first airing in 1975.

The special aired annually on ABC from 2001 until 2020, paired with A Charlie Brown Valentine starting in 2009. (In this special, Linus attempts to give a valentine to his teacher as Charlie Brown hopes to receive a one.) After that, Be My Valentine and other Peanuts specials left broadcast TV for streaming and moved to Apple TV.

After the original special aired in 1975, similar to what happened after It's the Great Pumpkin, Charlie Brown, many children sent Charlie Brown lots of valentines via Charles Schulz out of sympathy.

Home media
The special was released on the CED format in 1982 along with It's the Easter Beagle, Charlie Brown, He's Your Dog, Charlie Brown, and Life Is a Circus, Charlie Brown. It was released on VHS in 1986 and 1988, from Media Home Entertainment and its Hi-Tops Video subsidiary, respectively, through the "Snoopy's Home Video Library" collection. That release cut out the part in the opening scene where Snoopy keeps shooting arrows. It was released again in its entirety by Paramount Home Media Distribution on January 11, 1995, and was re-released in clamshell packaging on October 1, 1996. Paramount released the special on January 7, 2003 on DVD with You're in Love, Charlie Brown and It's Your First Kiss, Charlie Brown. It was rereleased on January 15, 2008 by Warner Home Video in a "remastered deluxe edition" with a new bonus featurette, "Unlucky in Love: An Unrequited Love Story". It has also been released on laserdisc, and is available on iTunes.

References

External links

 DVD Review of Deluxe Edition
 

Peanuts television specials
1970s animated television specials
CBS television specials
Television shows directed by Phil Roman
1970s American television specials
1975 television specials
1975 in American television
Valentine's Day television specials
Television shows written by Charles M. Schulz